Ma Ruifang (born 1942) is a Chinese author, scholar and professor at the School of Literature, Shandong University.

Biography
Ma was born in 1942 in Qingzhou, Shandong. Her grandfather Ma Defu and father Ma Chuzhen were doctors. She belonged to the Hui ethnic group. Her mother was educated. Ma read books in Yidu County Library when she studied at primary school. She was accepted into Shandong University and graduated in 1965. In 1966, Mao Zedong launched the Cultural revolution and she was persecuted. In 1980, Ma started to study the literature of Pu Songling.

Ma became popular in China for her lectures on literature of Pu Songling in the CCTV-10 program Lecture Room in 2005.

References

External links

1942 births
Living people
Educators from Shandong
Shandong University alumni
Academic staff of Shandong University
Hui people
Chinese Muslims
Writers from Weifang